Malik Jackson may refer to:

Malik Jackson (boxer) (born 1994), American boxer
Malik Jackson (linebacker) (born 1985), gridiron football linebacker
Malik Jackson (defensive lineman) (born 1990), American football defensive end/defensive tackle